Sahasralinga is a pilgrimage place, located around 14 km from the Sirsi Taluk in the district of Uttara Kannada of Karnataka state in India. It is in the river Shalmala and is famous for being the location where around a thousand lingas are carved on rocks in the river and on its banks.

"Sahasralingeshwara temple in Uppinangady is situated on the banks of the river Netravati and Kumaradhara, where a thousand lingas are found.
The story goes like: After Kurukshetra war, Krishna suggests Pandavas to get "Pushpa Mruga" to hold Rajasooryadwara Yaga. Bheema dashed to "Mahendragiri" to fetch it. On the way he meets Hanuman taking rest, which is stretched on his way. Bheema finds it difficult to cross the tail of Hanuman and requests to remove the tail. Hanuman asks Bheema to lift tail but he struggles and fails.Later both realised that both are divine powers. Hanuman learns the purpose of Bheem's journey and offers him hair from his tail for the protection. Bheem, after reaching Mahendragiri meets pushpamruga and it agrees on a condition that it would follow him only a "manovega"-speed at which mind moves. Bheem agrees trusting the tail hair. While leading the animal, whenever Bheem finds he cannot keep the pace with the animal, he drops a hair. Strangely a "Shivalinga" appears just on the spot and Pushpamruga proceeds only after worshipping the linga. This gives Bheem sufficient time to adjust his speed. When they reach the place called "Uppinangady", Bheem finds difficult and drops remaining one thousand tail hair. A thousand lingas appear and by the time animal completes worship, Bheem safely reaches Yagamantap. Thus it is believed that a thousand Lingas are found in the temple vicinity.One out of those Lingas found in the middle of the river sand becomes visible in the month of February.

The lingas in Uppinangady are under the river and are naturally formed, not carved.

History
The Shiva Lingas were built under the patronage of  Sadashivarayavarma, king of the Sirsi kingdom (1678-1718). It is also possible to see many Basava (bulls) which are carved in front of the Shivalingas.

Religious significance
Linga is a symbol of worship of the Hindu God, Shiva. On the auspicious day of Mahashivaratri thousands of pilgrims visit Sahasralinga to offer their prayers to Shiva.

See also 
 Sirsi Marikamba Temple
 Malenadu
 Yana, India

Notes

Villages in Uttara Kannada district